James Earl Henry (born 1964), most commonly referred to as "Jim Henry", is a vocal music professor, barbershop bass singer, and co-director of the Ambassadors of Harmony (AOH).  He is a multiple international award-winning quartet member, whose quartets have appeared nationally on the NBC, PBS, and Fox television networks. Henry is the current director of choral studies at the University of Missouri–St. Louis and a contributing author of widely used musical reference works.

Early life 
Henry grew up in St. Charles, Missouri and currently lives in St. Peters. He was 11 years old when he wrote a letter to the Daniel Boone Chorus begging to join. Henry soon became its youngest member. In 1981, notable arranger David Wright joined the chorus as director and set the chorus on a path to excellence. About that same time, Henry met a transformative choir teacher and chose to make vocal music his life's work. He graduated in 1986 from Southeast Missouri State in Cape Girardeau, Missouri and then completed his doctorate in music composition from Washington University in St. Louis in 2000.

Career 
Henry is the Director of Choral Studies at the University of Missouri-St. Louis (UMSL), where he conducts Vocal Point and the University Singers. He teaches choral methods, choral arranging, and choral conducting. From 2013 to 2016, Henry was the chair of the music department at the university. He is the clinician for the Acappellooza Fall field trips and Acappellooza Summer music camps, both partnerships between UMSL and AOH. He was previously head of the choral music department at Lindenwood University for nine years, during which time the University Chorus quintupled in size under his leadership. He also formed Voices Only, an a cappella ensemble that performed at the 2004 Missouri Music Educators Association conference, toured Germany, Holland and Sweden, and produced a recording. While at Lindenwood, he also taught and mentored 2004 Collegiate BHS Champions Vocal Spectrum (who went on to be 2006 Barbershop Harmony Society (BHS) International champions).

Barbershop harmony 

Henry is the musical and artistic co-director of the four-time BHS international champion chorus, the Ambassadors of Harmony, a 130-voice men's a cappella ensemble. He took over the reins of direction of the chorus from David Wright in 1990, and since 2013 has co-directed with Jonny Moroni. He currently sings bass with and arranges for Crossroads, 2009 BHS International Quartet Champions. Crossroads has performed worldwide, has appeared in television and radio broadcasts, and has produced three albums. Henry was previously the bass of the Gas House Gang, 1993 International Quartet Champions. The Gas House Gang produced five albums, performed in all fifty states and fifteen countries. Their television appearances and radio broadcasts include NBC's Today Show, NPR's Present at the Creation, and PBS specials. Henry, along with Brandon Guyton, Mike Slamka, and Fred Farrell formed Crossroads in 2007 as a traditional barbershop harmony quartet, a cappella music styles. Crossroads performs worldwide, and has also appeared on national TV programs such as Fox & Friends Weekend.

Henry travels worldwide as a guest conductor, coach, and lecturer. His doctoral thesis was on the origins of barbershop harmony. He is a contributing author for the Encyclopedia of American Gospel Music and the Grove Dictionary of American Music. Henry also served as bass section leader for the Saint Louis Symphony Chorus.

Awards 
 2019: Inducted to the Hall of Fame of the Barbershop Harmony Society
 2016: Stand for Music Award from the National Association for Music Education – Crossroads
 2016: Barbershop Harmony Society International Chorus Championship as Co-Director of the Ambassadors of Harmony
 2015: Selected as bass of the BHS Fantasy Gold Quartet with lead Mike Slamka, tenor Tim Waurick, and baritone Tony DeRosa
 2013: Joe Liles Lifetime Achievement Award – Barbershop Harmony Society
 2012: Contemporary A Cappella Recording Award – Best Barbershop Song (That Lucky Old Sun) – Crossroads
 2012: Barbershop Harmony Society International Chorus Championship as Director of the Ambassadors of Harmony
 2011: International Leadership Network Dare to Lead Award
 2010: Missouri Governor's Award for Excellence in Teaching
 2009: Barbershop Harmony Society International Quartet Championship – Crossroads
 2009: Barbershop Harmony Society International Chorus Championship as Director of the Ambassadors of Harmony
 2008: Inducted to Hall of Fame of the Barbershop Harmony Society – with The Gas House Gang
 2007: Outstanding District Director Award from the Missouri Choral Directors Association
 2005: Inducted to Hall of Fame of the Central States District (BHS)
 2004: Barbershop Harmony Society International Chorus Championship as Director of the Ambassadors of Harmony
 2001: Contemporary A Cappella Recording Award – Best Holiday Song (Go Tell It On The Mountain) – The Gas House Gang
 1999: Inducted to Hall of Fame of the Central States District (BHS) – with The Gas House Gang
 1997: Contemporary A Cappella Recording Award – Best Barbershop Song (Strike Up The Band Medley) – The Gas House Gang
 1993: Barbershop Harmony Society International Quartet Championship – The Gas House Gang

References 

1964 births
Barbershop Harmony Society
Barbershop music
Lindenwood University people
Musicians from Missouri
People from St. Charles, Missouri
People from St. Peters, Missouri
Southeast Missouri State University alumni
University of Missouri–St. Louis faculty
Washington University in St. Louis alumni
Living people